Buffalo (Main) Light is a lighthouse at the mouth of Buffalo River/Erie Canal, directly across from the Erie Basin Marina in Buffalo, New York.

History
The lighthouse was established and lit in 1833 and was deactivated in 1914. The foundation material was stone molehead and the lighthouse was constructed out of limestone and cast iron. The lens installed in 1857 was a third order Fresnel lens. The lens was later removed to the Buffalo History Museum.

This 60-foot-tall, octagonal limestone structure is the oldest still standing in its original location in the city of Buffalo. It replaced the original 1818 light on this site along the Lake Erie shore at the mouth of the Buffalo River. Presently, it is part of an outdoor museum located on the grounds of the United States Coast Guard Station.

It was listed on the National Register of Historic Places in 1984.

In 2010, the Coast Guard announced it would relinquish  of its  on the point and Congressman Brian Higgins obtained over $6 million to reconfigure the Coast Guard station to allow public access to the lighthouse. In April 2011, Erie Canal Harbor Development Corporation approved a grant of $170,700 to repair and restore the lighthouse in anticipation of public tours. The work was completed in August 2011.

References

Further reading
 Oleszewski, Wes. Great Lakes Lighthouses, American and Canadian: A Comprehensive Directory/Guide to Great Lakes Lighthouses, (Gwinn, Michigan: Avery Color Studios, Inc., 1998) .
 
 U.S. Coast Guard. Historically Famous Lighthouses (Washington, D.C.: Government Printing Office, 1957).
 Wright, Larry and Wright, Patricia. Great Lakes Lighthouses Encyclopedia Hardback (Erin: Boston Mills Press, 2006)

External links

Buffalo Main Light - U.S. National Register of Historic Places on Waymarking.com
Amateur Radio Lighthouse Society website

Inventory of Historic Light Stations--New York--Buffalo (Main) Light
Buffalo Main Light, By Colt Edin & Dave Wobser
Buffalo Lighthouse, Coast Guard Base across from the Erie Basin Marina - Buffalo as an Architectural Museum website
Buffalo Light: Guardian of the Harbor, Buffalo History Works website
Buffalo Main Lighthouse
Buffalo Main Light - United States Lighthouses

Lighthouses completed in 1833
Transportation buildings and structures in Buffalo, New York
Lighthouses on the National Register of Historic Places in New York (state)
Historic American Buildings Survey in New York (state)
National Register of Historic Places in Buffalo, New York
Lighthouses in Erie County, New York
1833 establishments in New York (state)